Wovenwar is the debut studio album by American metal band Wovenwar. Released on August 5, 2014, through Metal Blade Records, the album was produced by Bill Stevenson and mixed by Colin Richardson. The debut single, "All Rise", was released on April 21, 2014, followed by "The Mason" on June 18, 2014, and "Death to Rights" on February 17, 2015, with the latter single becoming the third most added song on active rock radio.

Wovenwar was generally well received by critics; at Metacritic, which assigns a normalized rating out of 100 to reviews from mainstream critics, the album received an average score of 71, based on 5 reviews. The album's musical style has been described as hard rock, alternative metal, melodic metalcore and modern heavy metal.

In mid-2014, the band performed with Black Label Society on their first North American tour. They accompanied In Flames later that year while they traveled Europe.

Track listing

Personnel 

Wovenwar
 Shane Blay – lead vocals, guitar
 Nick Hipa – lead guitar
 Phil Sgrosso – rhythm guitar, programming
 Josh Gilbert – bass, backing vocals, lead vocals (track 13)
 Jordan Mancino – drums

Production
 Produced by Wovenwar, Bill Stevenson and Jason Livermore
 Mastered by Ted Jensen at Sterling Sound, NYC
 Mixed by Colin Richardson, Joseph McQueen and Carl Bowen
 Vocal engineering by Bill Stevenson, Jason Livermore and Jason McQueen
 Guitar engineering by Phil Sgrosso, Nick Hipa and Daniel Castleman
 Drum and bass engineering by Bill Stevenson and Jason Livermore
 Studio assistant: Fernando Morales
 Booking by Nick Storch (ICM Talent, U.S.) and Paul Ryan (The Agency Group, International)
 Art direction and design by Ryan Clark (Invisible Creature)

Chart performance

References 

2014 debut albums
Wovenwar albums
Metal Blade Records albums
Albums produced by Bill Stevenson (musician)